Linode, LLC was an American cloud hosting provider that focused on providing Linux-based virtual machines, cloud infrastructure, and managed services.

In 2003, at the time of its launch, Linode was considered ahead of its time with virtual private server (VPS) hosting. It had grown over the years into a multinational corporation, well recognized by developers, hobbyists and small businesses alike with over 800,000 customers from 196 countries and data centers in 11 locations around the world. Linode was considered one of the largest independent cloud infrastructure providers before its acquisition.

Linode was acquired by Akamai Technologies in February 2022 for $900 Million. Akamai discontinued the Linode brand on February 14, 2023, with the launch of its "Akamai Connected Cloud" product line based on the combination of the Linode cloud computing platform and Akamai's existing content delivery network business.

History
Linode (a portmanteau of the words Linux and node) was founded in 2003 by Christopher Aker. Aker is a graduate of Full Sail University in Florida. 

Linode focused on providing Linux-based virtual servers to hobbyists, developers, as well as small and medium-sized businesses. The company grew steadily, and in 2008 it moved its headquarters to Galloway, New Jersey. Linode continued to expand over the years, relocating to the historic Corn Exchange National Bank building in Old City, Philadelphia, in 2018. Built in 1902, the Corn Exchange National Bank & Trust is a landmark in the City of Philadelphia. Named on Philadelphia’s registrar of historic places, the building was once an MTV Real World house. 

Linode opened its first data centers in Fremont, and Dallas in 2003. It subsequently opened its regions in Atlanta in 2007, Newark in 2008, London in 2009, Tokyo in 2011 and 2016, Frankfurt and Singapore in 2015, and Toronto, Mumbai, and Sydney in 2019.

Linode transitioned its virtualization platform from UML to Xen virtualization in March of 2008, and then to KVM based virtualization in mid-2015. Over the years, Linode launched numerous supporting services and products in combination with its core Linux-based VPS product (typically referred to as "Linodes").

On February 15, 2022, Akamai Technologies announced its intent to acquire Linode for $900 million; the company's founder and CEO Tom Leighton stated that it sought to "combine Linode's developer-friendly cloud computing capabilities with Akamai’s market-leading edge platform and security services".

On February 14, 2023, Akamai announced that the Linode brand had been discontinued, with all of its services brought under those of its parent as "Akamai Connected Cloud". The company announced that it would expand the footprint of the former Linode service offering by adding 13 new sites in Europe and the United States, some of which will be co-located with existing Akamai facilities.

Products and services
Linode's flagship products were cloud-hosting services with multiple packages at different price points. As of November 2019, Linode offered five kinds of virtualization-based computing services geared towards specific customer requirements like high memory requirements, dedicated CPU resources, virtual machines with direct access to GPUs, or general purpose usage. Linode Block Storage allowed users to extend their server storage capacity with network-based storage volumes. Linode Backup allowed customers to backup their servers on a daily, weekly, or biweekly basis. The Linode Manager allowed users to manage multiple server instances across a single interface.

In September 2013, Linode launched Longview, a system performance monitoring package for Linux that allowed users to view performance metrics of their instances from the Linode Cloud Manager. In late October 2019, Linode launched its S3-Compatible Object Storage service to enable customers to store large, unstructured data. On November 11, 2019, at CNCF KubeCon, Linode announced the availability of its managed Kubernetes engine service.

Compute 

 Linode Kubernetes Engine (LKE)  Kubernetes containers as a service application.
 GPU  On-demand cloud GPU (Graphical Processing Unit) compute configurations for parallel processing workloads such as machine learning, scientific computing, and video processing.
 Dedicated CPU  Dedicated CPU instances run on their own physical CPU cores on Linode infrastructure, not shared by other tenants.
 High Memory  High memory compute configurations to run memory-intensive applications.
 Shared Linodes  A balanced compute configuration for a wide range of cloud applications.
 Nanode  $5 per month entry level compute package to run a fully functioning Linux distribution.

Storage 

 Linode Object Storage  Highly available and scalable S3-Compatible object storage to store unstructured data.
 Linode Block Storage  Block storage to store data in volumes, or blocks, which act as individual hard disk drives (HDD).
 Linode Backups  Automatic data backup service.

Networking 

 VLAN  Virtual local area network
 DDoS Protection  Detection and mitigation of distributed denial-of-service (DDoS) infrastructure attacks.
 NodeBalancers  Software-defined, managed service for load balancing traffic to applications running on compute instances.
 DNS Manager  Managed Domain Name System (DNS) service on Linode infrastructure.

Management tools 

 Cloud Manager  A user- and mobile-friendly interface to deploy and manage Linode virtual machines, configure networking, and control user accounts.
 Linode API  API (Application Programming Interface) for programmatic access to the Linode platform.
 Linode CLI  CLI (Command Line Interface) account access from for managing Linode infrastructure.
 Images  Create customer Linux images to make scaling easier.
 StackScripts  Automatically customize Linode infrastructure deployments with StackScripts.
 Monitoring  Analyze infrastructure performance, track transfer usage, and create custom alerts.

Professional services 

 Managed  An incident response service to help businesses cut out costly downtime.
 Professional Services  Cloud consulting to help you architect your services, carry out site migrations, and deploy software.

Global network 

Linode operated 11 data centers around the world, interconnected by a backbone network. The company maintained internet exchange presence and peering arrangements and with internet service providers (ISPs) and other networks in each region to improve latency and connectivity to end users.

Regions and data centers 

As of Q2 2020, Linode was available in 11 regions worldwide. A region is a specific datacenter/geographical location where users can deploy cloud resources.

Awards 
Linode is a recipient of the Stevie Award for Sales and Customer Service. In 2019, Linode was awarded a Top Workplaces honor by The Philadelphia Inquirer. Linode’s headquarters building received the 2019 Grand Jury Award from the Preservation Alliance for Greater Philadelphia. The building, built in 1902, is a Philadelphia landmark, named on Philadelphia’s registrar of historic places, and was once an MTV Real World house.

Security incidents 

The accounts of eight Linode customers that held Bitcoin electronic currency were compromised in March 2012. Roughly 40,000 bitcoins were stolen.

Hack The Planet (HTP) accessed Linode's web servers in 2013. The group exploited a technical vulnerability in Adobe's ColdFusion application server. Linode said that HTP could not decrypt any financially sensitive information and reset all account passwords. Linode announced plans to introduce two-factor authentication for its services in May 2013.

Starting Christmas Day 2015 and continuing until January 10th, Linode was hit by large and frequent DDoS attacks, which were being caused by a "bad actor" purchasing large amounts of botnet capacity in an attempt to significantly damage Linode's business.  Linode was the victim of another severe DDoS attack over the 2016 Labor Day weekend.

See also
 Cloud computing

References

External links 
 

Cloud infrastructure
Cloud computing providers
Web services
Companies based in Philadelphia
Companies established in 2003
Internet hosting
2022 mergers and acquisitions